Venetian Gondolas is a gondola ride at Tokyo DisneySea theme park. It is located at the Mediterranean Harbor area.

Summary
Each gondola is steered by two gondoliers and has a seating capacity for 16 guests. The gondola is steered out into a canal that leads to the Mediterranean Harbor. Guests are asked by the gondoliers to say "Ciao!" to other gondola guests or the DisneySea Transit Steamer Line guests. The gondoliers also sing a song as the gondola returns to the loading area. The ride lasts for about 11.5 minutes.

Venetian Gondolas do not operate when shows are being set up and performed in Mediterranean Harbor.

References

External links
Venetian Gondolas at Tokyo DisneySea

Tokyo DisneySea
Mediterranean Harbor (Tokyo DisneySea)
Walt Disney Parks and Resorts attractions
Amusement rides introduced in 2001
2001 establishments in Japan